Francis Thomas Dean Carrington, (17 November 1843 – 9 October 1918) was a journalist, political cartoonist and illustrator in colonial Australia.

Carrington was born in London, England, and educated at the City of London School. He received his first lesson in drawing from George Cruikshank, and went through the South Kensington course. He commenced drawing for Clarke & Co., Paternoster Row, a title-page to one of Thomas Mayne Reid's novels being his first appearance in print.

Carrington came to Australia in the 1860s, and after some experience on the diggings at Wood's Point, Jericho, Jordan, and Crooked River, he joined Melbourne Punch in 1866, succeeding Nicholas Chevalier and O. R. Campbell. With this paper he was connected for twenty-one years, drawing the principal cartoons and many smaller blocks all through the stirring times of the Darling excitement and the "Berry blight." Carrington left Punch when it was amalgamated with The Bulletin, and joined the Melbourne Australasian.

Carrington died in Toorak, Victoria, he had two daughters with his wife Dora, née Clausen.

References

External links

1843 births
1918 deaths
19th-century Australian artists
Australian editorial cartoonists
English emigrants to colonial Australia
Cartoonists from Melbourne